Florence Maude  Young (2 October 1870 – 11 November 1920) was an Australian actor and singer.

Young was born in Melbourne, Victoria to Henry Henrard Young and his wife Elizabeth (née Tonkin).

Young made her stage debut as Beatrice in von Suppé's three-act operetta, Boccaccio for the Nellie Stewart Opera Company in Melbourne in June 1890. She was reported to have filled the part "very efficiently", her singing was "highly commendable" and of "her acting she has apparently not much to learn".

On 8 February 1897 Young married Robert Campbell Rivington of London at St Peter's Church, Eastern Hill, Melbourne. The marriage failed as Young preferred life on the Melbourne stage to that at Phillip Island with her husband was a grazier. He petitioned successfully for divorce on grounds of desertion in 1912. The case was uncontested.

Young died at Somerset House Private Hospital in East Melbourne. She was buried in the Melbourne General Cemetery after a service at St Peter's Church, Eastern Hill, Melbourne.

See also

 Eleanor Towzey (Nellie) Stewart
 James Cassius Williamson
 George Musgrove

References

Actresses from Melbourne
1870 births
1920 deaths
19th-century Australian actresses
20th-century Australian actresses
19th-century Australian women singers
20th-century Australian women singers
Burials at Melbourne General Cemetery
Singers from Melbourne